"The Wilhelm Scream" is a song by English musician James Blake, released on his self-titled debut studio album. It is a cover of the song "Where to Turn" by Blake's father, James Litherland. The single was released in the United Kingdom on 3 March 2011, and debuted on the UK Singles Chart at number 136. The cover version was retitled after the Wilhelm scream, a sound effect used in numerous movies. The single was used during the end credits of the HBO series Entourage. Rapper Big K.R.I.T. sampled the single in his song "REM". The song was covered by The Bamboos, featuring Megan Washington, released by Tru Thoughts in November 2011.

Critical reception
Mayer Nissim of Digital Spy gave the song a positive review stating:

As Blake's voice veers between an almost robotic coldness and grasping attempts at connection, the stripped-out backing plays around with space as much as it does notes. They key stuff happens from about two minutes in, as layers build in crashing waves of ambient terror until you find your teeth grinding and eyes welling up... before it all drops out again.

Pitchfork ranked this song 11th in their end of year list.

In January 2012, it was announced that Triple J listeners had voted "The Wilhelm Scream" number 92 in the 2011 Hottest 100. Additionally, the song earned Blake an Ivor Award nomination.

Track listing

Charts

Release history

References

2011 singles
2010 songs
James Blake (musician) songs
Polydor Records singles
Songs written by James Blake (musician)